Bob Carmichael and Frew McMillan were playing in World TeamTennis competition and couldn't defend their title.
Jimmy Connors and Ilie Năstase won the championship and $6,000 first-prize money following victory over Jürgen Fassbender and Hans-Jürgen Pohmann in the final.

Seeds
A champion seed is indicated in bold text while text in italics indicates the round in which that seed was eliminated.

Draw

Finals

Top half

Bottom half

References

External links

U.S. Clay Court Championships
1974 U.S. Clay Court Championships